Edward Hobson (1782–1830) was an English weaver and botanist who is associated with the Manchester School of Botany, as represented by such people at John Horsefield and Richard Buxton. His specialism was the study of bryology and one result of this was the publication of his two-volume collection of dried, pressed specimens, A Collection of Specimens of British Mosses and Hepaticae, between 1818 and 1822. This study served as a companion to the 1818 book, Muscologia Britannica: Containing the Mosses of Great Britain and Ireland that was produced by William Jackson Hooker and Thomas Taylor, from whom Buxton received encouragement.

References
Citations

Bibliography

Further reading

English botanists
19th-century British botanists
1782 births
1830 deaths
Scientists from Manchester